Procanthia nivea is a moth of the subfamily Arctiinae first described by Walter Rothschild in 1910. It is found in South Africa.

References

Endemic moths of South Africa
Moths described in 1910
Arctiinae